The 1980 United States presidential election in New Jersey took place on November 4, 1980. All 50 states and the District of Columbia, were part of the 1980 United States presidential election. Voters chose seventeen electors to the Electoral College, which selected the president and vice president.

New Jersey was won by the Republican nominees, former actor and Governor Ronald Reagan of California and former CIA Director George H.W. Bush of Texas. Reagan and Bush defeated the Democratic nominees, incumbent President Jimmy Carter of Georgia and his running mate incumbent Vice President Walter Mondale of Minnesota. Also in the running was former Republican Congressman John B. Anderson of Illinois, who ran as an Independent with former Ambassador and Governor Patrick Lucey of Wisconsin.

Reagan carried New Jersey with 51.97% of the vote to Carter’s 38.56%, a margin of 13.42%.

Anderson came in a strong but distant third, with 7.88% of the vote.

Reagan won 18 of the state’s 21 counties, with Carter only holding onto the 3 most heavily Democratic counties in New Jersey: Essex County, Hudson County, and Mercer County.

New Jersey weighed in for this election as almost 4% more Republican than the national average.

New Jersey in this era was a swing state with a slight Republican tilt; four years earlier, in 1976, the state had narrowly carried for Republican Gerald Ford over Jimmy Carter by a 50–48 margin, as Carter won nationally over Ford by a similarly narrow 50–48 margin. However, in 1980, with Reagan winning convincingly at the national level, the state easily remained in the Republican column. Carter was also hurt in the state by the candidacy of John Anderson, who had been a liberal Republican Congressman and whose campaign appealed strongly to Northeastern liberals and moderates who viewed Reagan as being too extreme and too far to the right, but who were dissatisfied with the status quo under the Carter Administration. Carter bled a substantial amount of support among such liberals and moderates in New Jersey who would likely have leaned Democratic in 1980 but instead voted for Anderson as a protest vote, pushing Carter below 40% and widening Reagan’s margin over Carter.

Results

Results by county

See also
 United States presidential elections in New Jersey
 Presidency of Ronald Reagan

References

United States presidential elections in New Jersey
1980 New Jersey elections
New Jersey